Darya Sar (also Romanized as Daryā Sar) is a village in Harazpey-ye Shomali Rural District, Sorkhrud District, Mahmudabad County, Mazandaran Province, Iran. At the 2006 census, its population was 337, in 92 families.

Elevation is more than 2,000 meters above sea level and is enclosed between four mountains. From the southwest, Mount Alamut is the tallest mountain that surrounds this plain.

References 

Populated places in Mahmudabad County